Joseph Beaumont (13 March 1616 – 23 November 1699) was an English clergyman, academic and poet.

Life
The son of John Beaumont, clothier, and of Sarah Clarke, his wife, he was born at Hadleigh, Suffolk, on 13 March 1616. He was educated at Hadleigh grammar school, and proceeded to Cambridge in 1631, where he was admitted as a pensioner to Peterhouse, Cambridge. He took his degree of B.A. in 1634, and became a fellow of his college in 1636, the master then being John Cosin. Richard Crashaw, the poet, had now passed from Pembroke College to Peterhouse, and in 1638 he and Beaumont received their degree of M.A. together

In 1644 he was one of the royalist fellows ejected from Cambridge, and he retired to Hadleigh, where he sat down to write his epic poem of Psyche. Beaumont fared particularly well during the Commonwealth. From 1643 he held the rectory of Kelshall in Hertfordshire, as non-resident, and in 1646 he added to this, or exchanged it for, the living of Elm-cum-Emneth in Cambridgeshire. He was appointed in the same year to a canonry of Ely.

In 1650 he became domestic chaplain to Matthew Wren, bishop of Ely, and held various other sinecures. The wealthy ward of the bishop, a Mistress Brownrigg, Elizabeth (baptised 13 January 1623 at Sproughton), the bishop’s step-daughter, fell in love with him, and they were married from Ely House in 1650. Beaumont and his wife resided for the next ten years at Tatingston Place, in Suffolk. During this period he wrote most of his minor poems.

At the Restoration of 1660 Beaumont was made Doctor of Divinity and one of the king's chaplains. Early in 1661 he went down to Ely to reside, at the bishop's request, but Mistress Beaumont caught the fen fever, and died on 31 May 1662. She was buried in Ely Cathedral. During his wife's fatal illness Beaumont was appointed master of Jesus College, Cambridge, in succession to John Pearson; and he moved to Cambridge with his six young children, only one of whom lived to manhood. He restored Jesus Chapel at his own expense; then on 24 April 1663 he was admitted master of Peterhouse.

His long controversy with Henry More, the Cambridge Platonist, dates from 1665. In 1674 he was appointed Regius Professor of Divinity, and delivered a course of lectures on Romans and Colossians, which he forbade his executors to publish. A collective evaluation of the soteriological lectures that he gave and the theological lectures that he moderated reveal his promotion of English-Arminianism at Cambridge, which was already established by his predecessor Peter Gunning. In 1689 he was appointed to meet the leaders of nonconformity as one of the commissioners of comprehension. He preached before the university on 5 November 1699, died on 23 November, and was buried in the college chapel of Peterhouse.

Works
Psyche, taking him eleven months to write, was published early in 1648. The allegorical poem represents the soul led by divine grace and her guardian angel through the various temptations and assaults of life into her eternal felicity; it is written in a six-line heroic stanza, and contains, in its abridged form, 30,000 lines. In 1702 Charles Beaumont, the only surviving son, brought out a new edition, entirely revised, and enlarged by the addition of four fresh cantos.

A life of Joseph Beaumont was written by John Gee of Peterhouse, who affixed it to the collection of Beaumont's poems which he first edited at Cambridge in 1749; further information was published by Hugh Pigot in his History of Hadleigh in 1860. The complete poems of Beaumont, in English and Latin, were first edited, in two quarto vols., privately printed, by A. B. Grosart in 1880, with a memoir in which some additions are made to the information preserved by Gee.

Beaumont prefixed a copy of Latin verses to the Muse Juridicae of William Hawkins in 1634, and published in 1665, at Cambridge, Some Observations upon the Apologie of Dr. Henry More. An artist of some pretension, he adorned the altar of Peterhouse Chapel with scripture scenes which have now disappeared.

References

Attribution

External links

1616 births
1699 deaths
17th-century English Anglican priests
Alumni of Peterhouse, Cambridge
Arminian ministers
Arminian writers
English male poets
Regius Professors of Divinity (University of Cambridge)
Masters of Jesus College, Cambridge
Masters of Peterhouse, Cambridge